Barcelona is an album by American jazz saxophonist Joe Henderson featuring an extended live track recorded in 1977 and two studio recordings from 1978 in West Germany which was released on the Enja label in 1979. Henderson appears in a trio with bassist Wayne Darling and drummer Ed Soph.

Reception 

The AllMusic review by Ron Wynn states "After many years of obscurity, Henderson has become famous in the last few years. But the whirling lines, huge tone, and astonishing solos that he routinely offers on this album have been prized by jazz fans since the early '60s".

Track listing 
All compositions by Joe Henderson
 "Barcelona" – 20:20
 "Barcelona" [continued] – 7:37
 "Mediterranean Sun" – 4:50
 "Y Ya la Quiero" – 5:12

Personnel 
Joe Henderson – tenor saxophone
Wayne Darling – bass
Ed Soph – drums

References 

1979 albums
Joe Henderson albums
Enja Records albums